Abbott's Hike is a long distance footpath in Northern England in the United Kingdom.

The route 

The walking is classed as challenging and is on upland and moorland.

It is named after its originator, Peter Abbott.

See also

List of long-distance footpaths

References

 Abbott, P., (1980) Abbott's Hike, Bury, Abbott.

External links
The Long Distance Walkers Association info on Abbott's Hike

Long-distance footpaths in England
Footpaths in Cumbria
Footpaths in North Yorkshire
Footpaths in West Yorkshire